Analekta is Canada's largest independent classical music recording label.

The label, which takes its name from the Greek word analekta ("a collection of the finest works"), was founded in 1988 by the Canadian music industry manager and entrepreneur François Mario Labbé, who is its owner and president. It is based in Montreal, Quebec, and has released more than 500 classical albums in the past 26 years.

Its first three CDs were an album by the Canadian violinist Angèle Dubeau, the first digital recording of the Red Army Choir, and a recording of the soundtrack of The Music Teacher starring José van Dam.

History 
In 1988, while François Mario Labbé was producing shows around the world, he had in mind three recording projects, including one from violinist Angèle Dubeau. The multinationals at the time rarely agreed to produce music from Canadian artists, hence Labbé's motivation to create a recording company that would be focused on them.

The label's initial CD was by Angèle Dubeau, followed by the world's first digital recording of the Red Army Choir, and the soundtrack to The Music Teacher starring José van Dam.

The success of these three recordings, both nationally and internationally, led to more signings, and in 1995 the company released 40 albums.

In April 2022, Outhere, a Belgian classical music and jazz publisher,  acquired Analekta.

Founder
Labbé is the founder and CEO of the Canadian classical recording label Analekta. He was honored in 2010 with the title of Knight of National Order of Quebec for his contribution to the cultural development of Quebec.

Artists 
Its catalogue includes recordings from major Canadian artists such as Angèle Dubeau, Alain Lefèvre, Kent Nagano and the Orchestre symphonique de Montréal, Marie-Nicole Lemieux, Anton Kuerti, Gryphon Trio, Ensemble Caprice, Stick&Bow, I Musici de Montréal, the Orchestre symphonique de Québec.

References

External links
 Official website

Classical music record labels
Canadian independent record labels
Record labels established in 1988